is the god of art, games, dance, flowers, and song in Aztec mythology.

Associations
As the patron of writing and painting, he was called  the "Seven-flower", but he could also be referred to as  "Five-flower". He was the patron of the game patolli. He is frequently paired with Xochiquetzal, who is seen as his female counterpart.  has also been interpreted as the patron of both homosexuals and male prostitutes, a role possibly resulting from his being absorbed from the Toltec civilization.

Xochipilli statue

In the mid-19th century, a 16th-century  Aztec statue of Xochipilli was unearthed on the side of the volcano Popocatépetl near Tlalmanalco. The statue is of a single figure seated upon a temple-like base. Both the statue and the base upon which it sits are covered in carvings of sacred and psychoactive organisms including mushrooms (Psilocybe aztecorum), tobacco (Nicotiana tabacum), Ololiúqui (Turbina corymbosa), sinicuichi (Heimia salicifolia), possibly cacahuaxochitl (Quararibea funebris), and one unidentified flower.

Laurette Séjourné has written: "The texts always use the flower in an entirely spiritual sense, and the aim of the religious colleges was to cause the flower of the body to bloom: This flower can be no other than the soul. The association of the flower with the sun is also evident. One of the hieroglyphs for the sun is a four-petalled flower, and the feasts of the ninth month, dedicated to Huitzilopochtliupo, were entirely given over to flower offerings."

The figure himself sits on the base, head tilted up, eyes open, jaw tensed, with his mouth half open and his arms opened to the heavens. The statue is currently housed in the Aztec hall of the Museo Nacional de Antropología in Mexico City.

Entheogen connection

It has been suggested by Wasson, Schultes, and Hofmann that the statue of Xochipilli represents a figure in the throes of entheogenic ecstasy. The position and expression of the body, in combination with the very clear representations of hallucinogenic plants which are known to have been used in sacred contexts by the Aztec support this interpretation. The statue appears to have hugely dilated pupils, suggesting an effect of hallucinogenic mushrooms.

Wasson says that in the statue's depiction Xochipilli "is absorbed by temicxoch, 'dream flowers', as the Nahua say describing the awesome experience that follows the ingestion of an entheogen. I can think of nothing like it in the long and rich history of European art: Xochipilli absorbed in temicxoch".

See also
Quiabelagayo

References

External links

J. Paul Getty Museum's in-depth interactive exploring the Museo Nacional de Antropología's 15th-century basalt figure of Xochipilli. Includes a detailed exploration of psychotropic plants depicted.
Erowid's Xochipilli Vault

Aztec gods
Arts gods
Dance gods
Nature gods
Love and lust gods
Homosexuality and bisexuality deities
Fertility gods
Music and singing gods